Cerelac is a brand of instant cereal made by Nestlé. The cereal is promoted for infants 6 months and older as a supplement to breast milk when it is no longer the sole item in an infant's diet. Cerelac is not a substitute for breast milk and it is advised to continue breast feeding or infant formula along with Cerelac. Cerelac can help babies develop tastes for other food as they are weaned from breast milk. It also contains vitamins and minerals like iron, along with essential fatty acids. Cerelac products also contain probiotics that are found in the digestive tracts of breastfed babies. The brand was first registered in 1949 and it is currently sold in Kenya, Tanzania, Belgium, Denmark, Germany, Spain, Portugal, South America, Central America, North America, India, the Middle East, Nigeria, North Africa, Malawi, Nepal, Pakistan, Philippines, Ghana, Ivory Coast, South Africa, South East Asia, United Kingdom, Zambia and Zimbabwe.

History
Developed by Henri Nestlé to reduce infant mortality in the 1860s, he invented Infant Cereals using existing nutritional science and technology.  The first product was called Farine Lactée and is believed to have saved the life of premature baby boy named Wanner.  By 1874, these infant cereals were sold in 18 countries. In the same year, vitamins were added. By 1948, they were marketed across the world. The brand was first registered in 1949. It contains most of the growth nutrition that is necessary for the baby at all development phases from 6 months onwards. It also has iron and essential minerals as Calcium, Vitamin D, protein, Zinc, Vitamin A, Vitamin C, Omega 3 and Omega 6, along with 18 important nutrients.

Products

Cerelac baby cereals are available in 4 stages

Stage 1: (At 6–7 months old) is formulated for babies from 6 months onwards and is available in variants of CERELAC Wheat, CERELAC Rice and CERELAC Maize. This can be given to the baby as a baby’s first food during the 6th month as these cereals are gelatin free and can be easily digested.

Stage 2: (7–8 months old,) can also be fed to infants from 6 months onwards and is available in CERELAC Banana and CERELAC Honey.

Stage 3: (8–12 months old) is available as CERELAC 3 Fruits and can be given to infants from 8 months onwards. This cereal contains real fruit pieces for different textures and tastes for babies who have chewing ability.

Stage 4 (12 months to 18 months)   is for babies who are accomplished eaters and are ready to try food the family is eating. Stage 4 is available in options like multi-grain and fruits, multi-grain and Dal Veg and other variants. It also has the iron plus bundle (iron, Vitamin C, iodine, omega 3 and Vitamin B1) which can help in brain and cognitive development. The products in this stage also contain Bifidus BL probiotics that strengthen the baby’s immune system and helps with his growth and development.

Stage 5 (After 18 months to 2 years) contains five grains and fruits combination which is made with fruits in textured shapes which are developmentally suitable for babies. Also contains wholegrain oats. The value added minerals, vitamins and fats enables the infant to gain health along with nutrition and taste.

References

External links 
 

1949 establishments in Switzerland
Nestlé cereals